Shalbatana Vallis is an ancient water-worn channel on Mars, located in the Oxia Palus quadrangle at 7.8° north latitude and 42.1° west longitude. It is the westernmost of the southern Chryse outflow channels.  Beginning in a zone of chaotic terrain, at 0° latitude and 46° W longitude, it ends in Chryse Planitia.

Shalbatana Vallis contains the first definitive evidence of a Martian shoreline. This delta and others around the basin imply the existence of a large, long-lived lake. Of special interest is evidence that the lake formed after the warm, wet period was thought to have ended. So, lakes may have been around much longer than previously thought.

It is the word for "Mars" in Akkadian.

See also

 Chaos terrain
 Geology of Mars
 HiRISE
 Lakes on Mars
 List of areas of chaos terrain on Mars
 Martian chaos terrain
 Outburst flood
 Outflow channels

References

Further reading

Valleys and canyons on Mars
Oxia Palus quadrangle